Waltair Main Road is a street in the heart of Visakhapatnam, the road is connecting to Jagadamba Centre and Siripuram. Andhra Pradesh state famous Andhra University located in this road. this road is one of the main shopping sport in the city and very important posh locality.

References

Roads in Visakhapatnam
Neighbourhoods in Visakhapatnam
Shopping districts and streets in India